The Panama Formation (Tp) is a geologic formation in Panama. The formation consists of tuffaceous sandstones, conglomerates, tuffaceous shales and algal and foraminifera-rich limestones, and preserves bivalve fossils of Leopecten gatunensis and Nodipecten sp. and dates back to the Late Oligocene period.

See also 

 List of fossiliferous stratigraphic units in Panama

References

Bibliography 
 
 

Geologic formations of Panama
Paleogene Panama
Sandstone formations
Shale formations
Conglomerate formations
Tuff formations
Limestone formations
Formations
Formations